County routes in Montgomery County, New York, are posted on street blade signs. They are typically otherwise unsigned; however, a handful of routes are also signed with the Manual on Uniform Traffic Control Devices-standard yellow-on-blue pentagon route marker.

Routes 1–50

Routes 51–100

Routes 101–150

Routes 151 and up

See also

County routes in New York
List of former state routes in New York (301–400)
List of reference routes in New York

Notes

References